Thomas Seaton Scott (16 August 1826 – 15 or 16 June 1895) was an English-born Canadian architect.  Born in Birkenhead, England he immigrated to Canada as a young man first settling in Montreal.  He was hired by the Grand Trunk Railway and worked for them on a number of structures including the Union Station in Toronto and Bonaventure Station in Montreal.

In 1871 he was hired by the Department of Public Works and he designed a number of Ottawa's new government buildings in the years after Canadian Confederation.  Among his works are the West Block of the Parliament of Canada, the Cartier Square Drill Hall, and the now demolished Dominion Post Office.  From 1872 to 1881 he held the position of Chief Dominion Architect and thus played at least a supervisory role in all major government projects.  He is considered one of the creators of the Dominion Style that dominated Canadian institutional architecture in the nineteenth century.  He was a founding member of the Royal Canadian Academy of Arts He was succeeded as Chief Architect by Thomas Fuller.

Works 

Other buildings designed by Scott include:

 houses for Edward Prentice on Bleury Street in Montreal 1858
 St. John's Anglican Church 490 Centre Street, Prescott, Ontario 1858–60
 residence for Thomas Mussen, Sherbrooke Street West near Bleury Street, Montreal 1859
 villa for Peter Robertson on Redpath Street, Montreal 1859
 Erin Cottage for James E. Major on Guy Street near Dorchester Street West, Montreal 1859
 Cathedral School House, Anglican Cathedral, Burnside Place at University Street, Montreal 1860
 Lumberman's Royal Arch for the Prince of Wales, Ottawa, Ontario 1860
 Ballymena residence for Rev. Richard Lewis, Maitland, Ontario 1863
 Rosemount villas for Robert J. Reekie, Rosemount Avenue, Montreal 1863
 Richmond Railway Station, Richmond, QC 1863; burned down 1883
 Rowhouses for Edward G. Penny, St. Nicholas Tolentine Street, near Dorchester Street West, Montreal 1864
 Thomas Mussen store on Notre Dame Street at St. Lambert Street store for Thomas Mussen, Montreal 1865
 Murray Bay Protestant Church, Murray Bay, QC 1867
 Bishop Strachan Memorial Anglican Church, Cornwall, Ontario 1869–75; now Trinity Anglican Church
 St. Mark's Presbyterian Church, William Street, Montreal (Griffintown), 1869–70; demolished 1925?
 Additions to Cornwall Court House & Gaol, Pitt Street, Cornwall, Ontario 1869
 Grace Anglican Church, Wellington Street Montreal, 1870–71
 Rideau Cottage, Ottawa,  1872 renovations

External links 
Biography at the Dictionary of Canadian Biography Online
Thomas Seaton Scott, Chief Dominion Architect 1872–1881
Canada`s Historic Sites

References 

1826 births
People from Birkenhead
1895 deaths
19th-century Canadian architects
Members of the Royal Canadian Academy of Arts